Tubiluchidae is one of the two families of priapulimorphidan priapulid worms.

Taxa 
The family includes only the genus Tubiluchus van der Land 1968, and in some classifications Meiopriapulus.
A full list of the included species:

References 

Priapulida
Ecdysozoa families